Events from the year 1971 in Canada.

Incumbents

Crown 
 Monarch – Queen Elizabeth II

Federal government 
 Governor General – Roland Michener
 Prime Minister – Pierre Trudeau
 Chief Justice – Gérald Fauteux (Quebec)
 Parliament – 28th

Provincial governments

Lieutenant governors 
Lieutenant Governor of Alberta – Grant MacEwan  
Lieutenant Governor of British Columbia – John Robert Nicholson 
Lieutenant Governor of Manitoba – William John McKeag 
Lieutenant Governor of New Brunswick – Wallace Samuel Bird (until October 2) then Hédard Robichaud (from October 8)
Lieutenant Governor of Newfoundland – Ewart John Arlington Harnum 
Lieutenant Governor of Nova Scotia – Victor de Bedia Oland  
Lieutenant Governor of Ontario – William Ross Macdonald
Lieutenant Governor of Prince Edward Island – John George MacKay 
Lieutenant Governor of Quebec – Hugues Lapointe 
Lieutenant Governor of Saskatchewan – Stephen Worobetz

Premiers 
Premier of Alberta – Harry Strom (until September 10) then Peter Lougheed  
Premier of British Columbia – W.A.C. Bennett 
Premier of Manitoba – Edward Schreyer  
Premier of New Brunswick – Richard Hatfield
Premier of Newfoundland – Joey Smallwood 
Premier of Nova Scotia – Gerald Regan  
Premier of Ontario – John Robarts (until March 1) then Bill Davis 
Premier of Prince Edward Island – Alexander B. Campbell 
Premier of Quebec – Robert Bourassa 
Premier of Saskatchewan – Ross Thatcher (until June 30) then Allan Blakeney

Territorial governments

Commissioners 
 Commissioner of Yukon – James Smith 
 Commissioner of Northwest Territories – Stuart Milton Hodgson

Events

January to June

February 16 - The Fuddle Duddle incident.
March 1 - Bill Davis becomes premier of Ontario, replacing John Robarts
March 4 - Prime Minister Trudeau weds Margaret Sinclair
March 31 - FLQ terrorist Paul Rose is sentenced to life in prison
April 5 - The first CANDU reactor begins operation at Gentilly, Quebec
April 14 - a riot begins at Kingston Penitentiary.  Prisoners seize control and a four-day siege ensues.
May 4 - A sinkhole destroys much of Saint-Jean-Vianney, Quebec, and kills 31
May 22 - Ontario Place opens in Toronto
June 1 - Census Day for the 1971 Census of Canada, which finds Canada's total population to be 21,568,311.
June 3 - The controversial Spadina Expressway project is cancelled
June 11 - Jack Davis becomes Canada's first Minister of the Environment, heading the new department of Environment Canada
June 14 - The Victoria Charter proposing constitutional reforms is written by the first ministers. It was later rejected by Robert Bourassa.
June 23 - Saskatchewan election: Allan Blakeney's NDP wins a majority, defeating Ross Thatcher's Liberals

June 30 - Allan Blakeney becomes premier of Saskatchewan, replacing Ross Thatcher

July to December
July 22 - Ross Thatcher, leader of the Saskatchewan Liberal Party dies in office
July 29 - The Bluenose II is donated to the province of Nova Scotia
July 30 - The Canada-based animation studio Nelvana is established by, Michael Hirsh, Patrick Loubert and Clive A. Smith in Toronto, Ontario
August 16 - Hurricane Beth hits Nova Scotia
August 28 - Canada's first gay rights demonstration, organized by George Hislop, takes place on Parliament Hill
August 30 - Alberta election: Peter Lougheed's PCs win a majority, defeating Harry Strom's Social Credit Party, which had governed for 36 years
September 10 - Peter Lougheed becomes premier of Alberta, replacing Harry Strom
October 4 - Petroleum is found under Sable Island
October 21 - Ontario election: Bill Davis's PCs win an eighth consecutive majority
November 1 - The Toronto Sun begins publication
November 1 - The Body Politic, Canada's first significant gay magazine, publishes its first issue.
November 2 - Gerhard Herzberg wins the Nobel Prize in Chemistry
November 12 - Air Canada Flight 812 is hijacked. Paul Joseph Cini is later arrested without incident.
December 1 - A moving Montreal Metro train crashes into a second parked train, killing one person.
December 26 - An Air Canada Flight 932 is hijacked by Patrick Critton, and flown to Cuba.

Full date unknown
Ontario Universities Application Centre founded
The first edition of The Canadian Rockies Trail Guide is published
Conrad Black and David Radler buy the Sherbrooke Record
Statistics Canada is formed to replace the Dominion Bureau of Statistics

Arts and literature 
July 1 - Joyce Wieland's "True Patriot Love" opens at the National Gallery of Canada. It is the Gallery's first solo exhibition devoted to the work of a living Canadian woman artist.
August 15 - The first Banff Festival of the Arts opens.

New works
Alice Munro: Lives of Girls and Women
Margaret Atwood: Power Politics
Milton Acorn: I Shout Love and On Shaving Off His Beard
Mordecai Richler: St. Urbain's Horseman
Joan Haggerty: Daughters of the Moon
Gordon R. Dickson: Tactics of Mistake
Brian Fawcett: Friends

Awards
See 1971 Governor General's Awards for a complete list of winners and finalists for those awards.
Stephen Leacock Award: Robert Thomas Allen, Wives, Children & Other Wild Life
Vicky Metcalf Award: Kay Hill

Sport 
January 18 – Ivan Koloff (Oreal Donald Perras) defeats Bruno Sammartino ending Sammartino's seven-and-a-half-year reign and became the first Canadian WWWF World Heavyweight Champion
March 13 – The Toronto Varsity Blues win their fifth (and third consecutive) University Cup by defeating the Saint Mary's Huskies 5 to 4. All games were played at Sudbury Community Arena
May 18 – The Montreal Canadiens win their 17th Stanley Cup by defeating the Chicago Black Hawks 4 games to 3. Hamilton's Ken Dryden is awarded the Conn Smythe Trophy
May 19 – The Quebec Junior Hockey League's Quebec Remparts win their won their first Memorial Cup by defeating the Western Canada Hockey League's Edmonton Oil Kings 2 game to 0. All games were played at the Colisée de Québec
June 3 – Montreal's Tarzan Tyler (Camille Tourville) becomes one half of the first World Wide Wrestling Federation Tag Team Champions (with Luke Graham) by defeating The Sheik (Ed Farhat) and Dick the Bruiser (William Richard Afflis) at the Joe Brown Center in New Orleans
November 20 – The Western Ontario Mustangs win their first Vanier Cup by defeating the Alberta Golden Bears by a score of 15–14 in the 7th Vanier Cup played at Varsity Stadium in Toronto
November 28 – The Calgary Stampeders win their second (and first since 1948) Grey Cup by defeating the Toronto Argonauts 14 to 11 in the 59th Grey Cup played in Vancouver's Empire Stadium
December 6 – Quebec City's Rene Goulet becomes the second Canadian to win World Wrestling Federation Tag Team Champion (with Karl Gotch) by defeating Luke Graham and Tarzan Tyler at Madison Square Garden in New York City

Date unknown
 Disc sport pioneer Ken Westerfield immigrates to Canada
 Harold Ballard gains full control of the Toronto Maple Leafs.

Births

January to June
January 3 - Cory Cross, ice hockey player
January 9 
Hal Niedzviecki, author and critic
Scott Thornton, ice hockey player
January 18 - Seamus O'Regan, broadcast journalist and television co-host
January 23 - Carla Robinson, television journalist
January 27 - Patrice Brisebois, ice hockey player
February 17 - Martyn Bennett, musician (d. 2005)
February 24 - Brian Savage, ice hockey player and coach
February 25 - Daniel Powter, singer
March 6 - Val Venis, professional wrestler
March 8 - Bob Boughner, ice hockey player
March 20 - Janis Kelly, volleyball player
March 27 - Nathan Fillion, actor
April 1 - Danielle Smith, journalist and politician
April 2 - Conrad Leinemann, beach volleyball player
April 4 - Steph St. Laurent, documentary filmmaker, videographer, photographer, actor, writer, environmentalist and activist
April 9 - Jacques Villeneuve, motor racing driver
April 19 - Scott McCord, voice actor
June 15 - Bif Naked, rock singer-songwriter, poet, cartoonist and actress
June 26 - Christine Nordhagen, wrestler
June 26 - Edward Parenti, swimmer
June 29 - Matthew Good, musician
June 30
 Megan Fahlenbock, voice actress
 Jamie McLennan, retired professional ice hockey goaltender, radio sports analyst

July to September
July 2 - Evelyn Lau, poet and novelist
July 10 - Adam Foote, ice hockey player
July 17 - Cory Doctorow, blogger, journalist and science fiction author
July 20 - Sandra Oh, actress
July 30 - Tom Green, actor, rapper, writer, comedian and media personality
August 12
 Patrick Carpentier, racing driver
 Phil Western, musician (d. 2019)
August 25 - Peter Oldring, voice actor, improviser, actor and comedian
September - Chris Klein-Beekman, aid worker killed in Iraq (d. 2003)
September 6 - Fiona Milne, rower and World Champion

October to December
October 1 - Guylaine Cloutier, swimmer
October 5 - Sam Vincent, voice actor and singer
October 7 - Todd Smith, Ontario MPP
October 15 - Jamie Nicholls, Politician
October 21 - Johanne Bégin, water polo player
October 30 - Peter New, actor and screenwriter
November 24 - Keith Primeau, ice hockey player
December 9 - Petr Nedvěd, ice hockey player
December 14 - Scott Koskie, volleyball player
December 23 - 
 Corey Haim, actor (d. 2010)
 Estella Warren, actress, former fashion model, and former synchronized swimmer
December 25 - Justin Trudeau, politician and 23rd prime minister of Canada

Deaths

January to June
January 5 - Douglas Shearer, sound designer and recording director (b.1899)
January 19 - David Florida, pioneer in space research
February 4 - Brock Chisholm, doctor and first Director-General of the World Health Organization (b.1896)
March 25 - Anne Savage, painter and art teacher (b.1896)
April 5 - Maurice Brasset, politician and lawyer (b.1884)
April 14 - Hector Authier, politician, lawyer and news reporter/announcer (b.1881)
April 17 - Carmen Lombardo, singer and composer (b.1903)
April 19 - Earl Thomson, athlete and Olympic gold medalist (b.1895)
May 2 - John Horne Blackmore, politician (b.1890)
May 3 - Georges Poulin, hockey player (b. 1887)
June 19 - Albert A. Brown, politician and lawyer (b.1895)

July to December
July 10 - Samuel Bronfman, businessman (b.1889)
July 22 - Ross Thatcher, politician and 9th Premier of Saskatchewan (b.1917)
July 28 – Annon Lee Silver, lyric soprano (b.1938)
September 4 - James Gladstone, first Status Indian to be appointed to the Senate of Canada (b.1887)
November 17 - Arthur Roebuck, politician and labour lawyer (b.1878)
November 25 - Leonard W. Murray, naval officer (b.1896)
December 11 - Kate Aitken, radio journalist, cookbook writer (b.1891)

See also
 1971 in Canadian television
 List of Canadian films of 1971

References

 
Canada
Years of the 20th century in Canada
1971 in North America